Kevin George Fotheringham (born 13 August 1975) is a Scottish former footballer and football coach. 

Fotheringham played as a defender for several Scottish clubs and Víkingur Ó. in Iceland.

Fotheringham was given an 8 match ban by the Scottish Football Association in February 2008, following allegations that he had racially abused Stranraer player Gregory Tade during a match whilst playing for East Fife.

Kevin has also coached East of Scotland sides Hill of Beath Hawthorn and Dundonald Bluebell in his time within the sport.

References

External links

1975 births
Living people
Footballers from Dunfermline
Scottish footballers
Association football defenders
Rangers F.C. players
Ross County F.C. players
Hamilton Academical F.C. players
Raith Rovers F.C. players
Arbroath F.C. players
Brechin City F.C. players
Clyde F.C. players
St Johnstone F.C. players
Ungmennafélagið Víkingur players
East Fife F.C. players
Forfar Athletic F.C. players
Scottish Football League players
Expatriate footballers in Iceland
Scottish expatriate sportspeople in Iceland
St Andrews United F.C. players
Scottish Junior Football Association managers
Scottish football managers
Scottish expatriate footballers
Úrvalsdeild karla (football) players
Scottish Junior Football Association players